René Smet (24 April 1898–1980) was a Belgian rower and boxer. In rowing, he competed at the 1920 Summer Olympics in Antwerp with the men's eight where they were eliminated in round one. At the same Olympic Games, he competed in the welterweight class in boxing where he was eliminated in round two.

References

1898 births
1980 deaths
Belgian male rowers
Olympic rowers of Belgium
Belgian male boxers
Olympic boxers of Belgium
Rowers at the 1920 Summer Olympics
Boxers at the 1920 Summer Olympics
Welterweight boxers
European Rowing Championships medalists
20th-century Belgian people